Fındıklı is a village in the Tercan District, Erzincan Province, Turkey. The village is populated by Kurds and had a population of 59 in 2021.

The hamlets of Danacık and Yavancı are attached to the village.

References 

Villages in Tercan District
Kurdish settlements in Erzincan Province